Merlyn Merlyn-Rees, Baron Merlyn-Rees,  (né Merlyn Rees; 18 December 1920 – 5 January 2006) was a British Labour Party politician and Member of Parliament from 1963 until 1992. He served as Secretary of State for Northern Ireland (1974–1976) and Home Secretary (1976–1979).

Early life
Rees was born in Cilfynydd, near Pontypridd, Glamorgan, the son of Levi Rees, a war veteran who moved from Wales to England to find work. He was educated at Harrow Weald Grammar School, Harrow, England and Goldsmiths College, London where he was president of the students' union. Goldsmiths was evacuated to Nottingham University early in the war, where Rees served in Nottingham University Air Squadron. 

In 1941 Rees joined the Royal Air Force, becoming a squadron leader and earning the nickname "Dagwood". He served in Italy as operations and intelligence officer to No 324 Squadron under Group Captain W. G. G. Duncan Smith (father of the future Conservative leader). One of Rees's Spitfire pilots in Italy, Frank Cooper, became his Permanent Secretary at the Northern Ireland Office. He attended the London School of Economics where he received BSc(Econ) and MSc(Econ). He was appointed schoolmaster at his old school in Harrow in 1949, teaching economics and history. He taught for eleven years, during which time he was three times an unsuccessful parliamentary candidate for Harrow East, in 1955, 1959, and in a 1959 by-election. He was a member of the Institute of Education at the University of London from 1959 to 1962.

Member of Parliament
At a by-election in 1963, Rees stood successfully as the Labour candidate for Leeds South, succeeding Labour leader Hugh Gaitskell, who had died in office. (The constituency was renamed Morley and Leeds South in 1983.) He held the seat until he stepped down from the House of Commons at the 1992 general election.  

In 1965 Rees became Parliamentary Under-Secretary at the Ministry of Defence, with responsibility for the army (1965–66) and later for the Royal Air Force (1966–68). Denis Healey, who was then Secretary of State for Defence, had served with Rees in the Italian campaign. Rees was Parliamentary Under-Secretary at the Home Office, where James Callaghan was Home Secretary, from November 1968 until the June 1970 general election.

In October 1971 Rees became Labour Party spokesman on Northern Ireland. When the Labour government returned to power in March 1974, he was appointed Secretary of State for Northern Ireland.  One month after Rees's appointment, he lifted the proscription against the illegal loyalist paramilitary organisation, the Ulster Volunteer Force (UVF) in an attempt to bring them into the democratic process. However, the organisation was implicated in the 17 May 1974 Dublin and Monaghan bombings and the group was once more banned by the British Government on 3 October 1975. Rees’ decision to permit the Sunningdale power sharing arrangements to collapse in Northern Ireland was described as ‘supine’ by former SDLP leader, Seamus Mallon. Rees was almost assassinated by the IRA in July 1976. He was to travel to the Republic to consult with the Ambassador Christopher Ewart-Biggs and Irish ministers, but postponed his trip after Margaret Thatcher refused to allow Northern Ireland ministers to pair their votes in House of Commons divisions. Rees wrote later that it seemed likely the IRA had known of his impending visit but were unaware of its cancellation. Ewart-Biggs and FCO official Judith Cooke died in a landmine explosion.

Rees later wrote of his experiences in Northern Ireland in Northern Ireland: a Personal Perspective.
In September 1976 Rees was appointed Home Secretary and remained in that post until Labour's defeat in the 1979 UK elections.

Retirement

When Rees retired from the House of Commons in 1992, he was created a life peer as Baron Merlyn-Rees, of Morley and South Leeds in the County of West Yorkshire and of Cilfynydd in the County of Mid Glamorgan and entered the House of Lords, having changed his name, on 23 June 1992, by deed poll to Merlyn Merlyn-Rees to allow his title to be Merlyn-Rees rather than Rees.

Rees was president of the Video Standards Council from 1990 and was the first Chancellor of the University of Glamorgan, a position he held from 1994 to 2002.

Death
He suffered injuries in a number of falls, and failing to recover from these, fell into a coma, dying at the age of 85. He was survived by his wife Colleen and three sons.

Legacy
Merlyn Rees Avenue in Morley, West Yorkshire is named after Rees.  Merlyn Rees Community High School in Belle Isle, Leeds was named after Rees until its merger with Mathew Murray Comprehensive School in 2006 when it was renamed South Leeds High School.

References

Reading
 Merlyn Rees, "Northern Ireland: a personal perspective", London: Methuen, 1985.

External links
 
 
 Merlyn Rees (The Second World War Experience Centre)
 Catalogue of the Merlyn-Rees papers at the Archives Division of the London School of Economics.

|-

|-

|-

|-

1920 births
2006 deaths
Academics of the UCL Institute of Education
Accidental deaths in London
Accidental deaths from falls
Alumni of Goldsmiths, University of London
Alumni of the London School of Economics
Chancellors of the University of Glamorgan
Labour Party (UK) MPs for English constituencies
Labour Party (UK) life peers
Members of the Privy Council of the United Kingdom
People from Pontypridd
People of The Troubles (Northern Ireland)
Royal Air Force personnel of World War II
Secretaries of State for Northern Ireland
Secretaries of State for the Home Department
UK MPs 1959–1964
UK MPs 1964–1966
UK MPs 1966–1970
UK MPs 1970–1974
UK MPs 1974
UK MPs 1974–1979
UK MPs 1979–1983
UK MPs 1983–1987
UK MPs 1987–1992
Ministers in the Wilson governments, 1964–1970
Royal Air Force squadron leaders
Life peers created by Elizabeth II